Greatest Hits Volume Two is the second greatest hits collection released in 1991 by the American country music duo The Judds. It features ten tracks from their previous studio albums. No new material was recorded for this album. This was also their final release before Wynonna Judd parted for a solo career.

Track listing

Personnel

The Judds
 Naomi Judd - vocals
 Wynonna Judd - vocals

Additional Musicians
 Eddie Bayers - drums
 Craig Bickhardt - acoustic guitar
 Mark Casstevens - acoustic guitar, electric guitar
 Christ Church Choir - choir
 Sonny Garrish - dobro, pedal steel guitar
 Roy Huskey Jr. - upright bass
 John Barlow Jarvis - piano
 Kirk "Jelly Roll" Johnson - harmonica
 Farrell Morris - percussion
 Bobby Ogdin - organ, piano
 Carl Perkins - electric guitar
 Don Potter - acoustic guitar, electric guitar
 Jack Williams - bass guitar

Charts

Weekly charts

Year-end charts

Certifications

References

1991 greatest hits albums
The Judds compilation albums
Curb Records compilation albums
RCA Records compilation albums
Albums produced by Brent Maher